Frisilia crossophaea is a moth in the family Lecithoceridae. It is found in Sikkim, India. Only holotype, a female, is known.

References

Frisilia
Moths of Asia
Endemic fauna of India
Moths described in 1931
Taxa named by Edward Meyrick